XII (Howitzer) Brigade, Royal Field Artillery was a brigade of the Royal Field Artillery which served in the First World War.

It was originally formed with 43rd, 86th and 87th (Howitzer) Batteries, each equipped with 4.5-inch howitzers, and attached to 6th Infantry Division. In August 1914 it mobilised and in September was sent to the Continent with the British Expeditionary Force, where it saw service with 6th Division until broken up. 86th Battery was withdrawn in May 1915, and assigned to 127th (Howitzer) Brigade.

In May 1916, the artillery brigades of infantry divisions were reorganised; the pure howitzer brigades were disbanded, and their batteries attached individually to field brigades, in order to produce mixed brigades of three field batteries and one howitzer battery. Accordingly, the brigade was broken up and the batteries dispersed; 43rd to 24th Brigade, and 87th Battery to 2nd Brigade.

Notes

References

External links
Royal Field Artillery Brigades
6th Division Order of Battle

Royal Field Artillery brigades
Artillery units and formations of World War I